Irving Alexis Wilson (born August 13, 1996) is a Mexican professional baseball catcher for the Tigres de Quintana Roo of the Mexican League. He signed with the St. Louis Cardinals as an international free agent in 2014.

Career

St. Louis Cardinals
On March 28, 2014, Wilson signed with the St. Louis Cardinals organization as an international free agent. He made his professional debut with the Dominican Summer League Cardinals, going 4-for-19 in 6 games. In 27 games for the team in 2015, Wilson batted .248/.339/.446 with 2 home runs and 21 RBI.

In 2016, Wilson split the year between the DSL Cardinals and the rookie-level GCL Cardinals, recording a .226/.335/.278 slash line with no home runs and 18 RBI. The following year, Wilson split the season between the rookie-level Johnson City Cardinals and the Low-A State College Spikes, accumulating a .248/.347/.390 batting line with 2 home runs and 17 RBI. In 2018, Wilson split the year between State College and the Single-A Peoria Chiefs, batting .200/.339/.276 with no home runs and 5 RBI in 35 games between the two teams. In 2019, Wilson split the season between Peoria and the High-A Palm Beach Cardinals, hitting .281/.339/.384 with a career-high in home runs, with 5, and 17 RBI.

Wilson did not play in a game in 2020 due to the cancellation of the minor league season because of the COVID-19 pandemic. On May 27, 2020, Wilson was released by the Cardinals organization.

Tigres de Quintana Roo
On May 20, 2021, Wilson signed with the Tigres de Quintana Roo of the Mexican League.

International career
Wilson was selected to the Mexico national baseball team at the 2020 Summer Olympics (contested in 2021).

References

External links

1996 births
Living people
Mexican expatriate baseball players in the United States
Dominican Summer League Cardinals players
Mexican expatriate baseball players in the Dominican Republic
Tomateros de Culiacán players
Gulf Coast Cardinals players
Johnson City Cardinals players
State College Spikes players
Peoria Chiefs players
Palm Beach Cardinals players
Tigres de Quintana Roo players
Baseball players from Sinaloa
Sportspeople from Los Mochis
Baseball players at the 2020 Summer Olympics
Olympic baseball players of Mexico
2023 World Baseball Classic players